José Rafael Romo Pérez (born 6 December 1993) is a Venezuelan professional footballer who plays as a striker for Cypriot First Division club AEL Limassol. He previously played domestically for Llaneros, Deportivo Petare, ACD Lara and Aragua, in the Spanish Tercera División for Rayo Vallecano B, and for Cypriot clubs Olympiakos Nicosia and Karmiotissa. He represented Venezuela at under-20 level.

Club career
His father, Rafael Romo Abad, played football professionally as a goalkeeper, and he is a younger brother of Venezuelan international goalkeeper Rafael Romo. Romo played youth football for Atlético Turén and Deportivo Táchira before beginning his professional career with Llaneros in the 2011–12 Venezuelan Primera División. After two seasons and 39 Primera División appearances (8 goals), he signed a two-year contract with another top-flight club, Deportivo Petare. He was used mainly as a substitute, scored only once, and spent the second year of his contract on loan to ACD Lara. He was a regular starter during the Apertura, less so in the second half of the season, but made three appearances in the play-offs for qualification for the Copa Sudamericana, in which Lara lost out to Carabobo in a penalty shoot-out.

Romo spent the 2016–17 season with Rayo Vallecano B of the Spanish Tercera División (fourth tier). He missed some time through injury, but finished the season with five goals from 27 appearances. In December 2016, he was back in Venezuela to sign for Aragua. He played regularly for the Primera División club for one-and-a-half seasons, and then left after the 2018 Apertura to return to Europe. He signed for Cypriot Second Division club Olympiakos Nicosia; his brother Rafael was at the time playing for another Nicosia-based club, APOEL. In his first season, he scored six goals from his first seven outings, and ended the season with fifteen as he helped his team finish second in the division and gain promotion to the First Division. He was an unused substitute once in the First Division for Olympiakos, but was then loaned to another Second Division team, Karmiotissa. Again, he helped his team gain promotion, this time as 2019–20 champions. He then signed for Karmiotissa, and continued to play and score regularly in the top flight. In June 2021, he signed a three-year contract with Cypriot First Division club AEK Larnaca.

International career
During his second season with Llaneros, he was selected for Venezuela's under-20 squad for the 2013 South American Youth Football Championship. He appeared in three of his country's four group matches as they finished fourth in their five-team group and did not progress further.

While at Rayo Vallecano in 2016, Romo was checked out by new Venezuela senior team manager, Rafael Dudamel, ahead of an unofficial friendly against Galicia, but he was not chosen.

Career statistics

References

1993 births
Living people]
People from Portuguesa (state)
Venezuelan footballers
Venezuela under-20 international footballers
Association football forwards
Deportivo Táchira F.C. players
Llaneros de Guanare players
Deportivo Miranda F.C. players
Asociación Civil Deportivo Lara players
Rayo Vallecano B players
Aragua FC players
Olympiakos Nicosia players
Karmiotissa FC players
AEK Larnaca FC players
AEL Limassol players
Venezuelan Primera División players
Tercera División players
Cypriot Second Division players
Cypriot First Division players